The following lists events that happened in 1948 in El Salvador.

Incumbents
President: Salvador Castaneda Castro (until 14 December), Revolutionary Council of Government (starting 14 December 14)
Vice President: Manuel Adriano Vilanova(until 14 December), Vacant (starting 14 December)

Events

February

 14 December – President Salvador Castaneda Castro was deposed in a military coup d'état. The Revolutionary Council of Government was established.

March
 2 March – C.D. Sonsonate, a Salvadoran football club, was established.

Undated
 C.D. Audaz, a Salvadoran football club, was established.

Births

 24 June – Armando Calderón Sol, politician (d. 2017)

References

 
El Salvador
1940s in El Salvador
Years of the 20th century in El Salvador
El Salvador